The following lists events that happened in 1915 in Iceland.

Incumbents
Danish Minister for Iceland – Sigurður Eggerz (until 4 May); Einar Arnórsson (from 4 May)

Events

 The sports club Þór Akureyri established 
 The sports club Magni Grenivík established

1915 Úrvalsdeild

Births

5 January – Haukur Óskarsson, footballer (d. 1989).

19 September – Jóhann Hafstein, politician (d. 1980).

Deaths

23 June – Þorgils gjallandi, writer (b. 1851)

References

 
1910s in Iceland
Iceland
Iceland
Years of the 20th century in Iceland